Abrothrix longipilis, also known as the long-haired grass mouse or long-haired akodont, is a species of rodent in the family Cricetidae. It is found in central and southern Argentina and Chile. The southern Chilean Abrothrix sanborni may not be distinct from this species.

Description
It varies in colour across its wide range, but in most populations the dorsal hair is reddish-brown with long guard hairs, the flanks are more greyish and the underparts are grey. The tail is bicoloured, dark above and pale below.

Distribution and habitat
The species is found in central and southern Chile, and in Argentina as far southward as the Rio Negro and Chubut provinces of Patagonia. Its chief habitat is the Nothofagus forests of the region but it is also found in rocky areas, marshy areas, tussock grass and steppe with shrubs.

Ecology
The long-haired grass mouse is active both in the day and the night. It is an efficient excavator and digs burrows, but it is also a good tree climber. In Argentina it feeds on berries, seeds, insects, slugs, worms, fungi and fern spores. The diet differs in different parts of Chile, either consisting of insects and plant material, or insects and fungi, just insects or just fungi. Breeding takes place in the spring and summer. The litter size averages just below four and at least some individuals overwinter twice. Home ranges in the Patagonian Nothofagus forest vary between 0.4 and 4.8 individuals per hectare in spring, and 2.8 to 10.8 individuals per hectare in autumn. This grass mouse is preyed on by the barn owl, the lesser horned owl, the rufous-legged owl, the white-tailed kite and the South American gray fox. It is also an important reservoir species for the Andes virus, which is a major causative agent of the disease Hantavirus cardiopulmonary syndrome.

Status
A. longipilis has a wide range and is presumed to have a large total population. The population trend may be downward but it is an abundant species and the decline is not at a rate to cause concern, so the International Union for Conservation of Nature has rated its conservation status as being of "least concern".

References

Literature cited

Pardinas, U., D'Elia, G. & Patterson, B. 2008. . In IUCN. IUCN Red List of Threatened Species. Version 2009.2. <www.iucnredlist.org>. Downloaded on January 12, 2010.

Mammals of Argentina
Mammals of Chile
Abrothrix
Mammals described in 1837
Taxonomy articles created by Polbot